William L. Donaldson (November 8, 1899 – April 30, 1977) was an American politician and educator. He was a member of the Maryland House of Delegates, representing Washington County, Maryland from 1967 to 1970.

Early life
William L. Donaldson was born on November 8, 1899, in Fairfield, Pennsylvania to William C. and Francis Scott Donaldson. He attended public schools in Fairfield and Gettysburg Academy. Wagaman graduated with a Bachelor of Arts and a Master of Science from Gettysburg College in 1924.

Career
Donaldson worked as an educator. He developed an educational survey of Nigeria for the United States government. Donaldson served in the Maryland House of Delegates, representing Washington County, Maryland, from 1967 to 1970. He was elected as a Republican.

Personal life
Donaldson married Helen E. Eigenbrode. They had one son, William C. Donaldson.

Donaldson died on April 30, 1977, at Washington County Hospital in Hagerstown, Maryland. He was buried at Fairfield Union Cemetery.

References

1899 births
1977 deaths
People from Adams County, Pennsylvania
Gettysburg College alumni
Educators from Maryland
Republican Party members of the Maryland House of Delegates
20th-century American politicians